Mount Wood may refer to:

 Mount Wood (Palmer Land), Antarctica
 Mount Wood (Victoria Land), Antarctica
 Mount Wood (New South Wales), in Sturt National Park, Australia
 Mount Wood (Yukon), Canada
 Mount Wood (Occidental Mindoro), Philippines
 Mount Wood (California), US
 Mount Wood (Montana), US

See also 
 Mount Woods
 Wood Mountain (disambiguation)